Geo Imaging Satellite or GISAT is an Indian imaging satellite class for geostationary orbit with a high temporal resolution, meant for providing near real time imaging with fast revisit capability and real time monitoring. Two satellites will provide resolution in the range of 42 to 318 m. It will carry multi-spectral (Visible and Near-InfraRed, and Short Wave-InfraRed), multi-resolution (42 to 318 m) imaging instruments. 

The first satellite; EOS-3 (aka GISAT-1) was launched on 12 August 2021 but failed to reach orbit as cryogenic upper stage of GSLV could not ignite. EOS-3 was supposed to fulfil civilian applications.

The second satellite, EOS-5 (aka GISAT-2) will be acquired by Indian Navy and will differ slightly in capabilities compared to EOS-03 (aka GISAT-1).

Payload 

GISATs will image in multi-spectral and hyper-spectral bands to provide near real-time pictures of large areas of the country, under cloud-free conditions, at frequent intervals which is, selected field image in every 5 minutes and entire Indian landmass image every 30 minutes at 42 m spatial resolution.

Features of GISAT-1 are:
 700 mm Ritchey–Chrétien telescope based on the design of Cartosat-2A
 Array detectors in Visible and Near-InfraRed (VNIR), and Short Wave-InfraRed (SWIR) bands
 Electronically steerable, phased array antenna
 High agility, jitter-free platform

Launch schedule 
The first launch of GISAT failed to orbit due to an issue with its GSLV Mk II's third stage. The second launch is planned for 2022.

See also 

 NAVIC
 INSAT
 GSAT
 Cartosat
 RISAT

References 

Satellites of India
Earth observation satellites of India
Spacecraft launched in 2021
2021 in India
Satellites in geostationary orbit